Winehaven may refer to:

Winehaven Winery, winery and vineyard in Chisago City, MN
Winehaven, California, former winery and city in California